Long intergenic non-protein coding RNA 520 is a long non-coding RNA that in humans is encoded by the LINC00520 gene.

References 

Proteins